HMS Seafire was an  built for the Royal Navy during the First World War. She saw service during the Allied intervention in the Russian Civil War. The ship was sold for scrap in 1936.

Description
The Admiralty S class were larger and faster versions of the preceding . They displaced  at normal load. The ships' complement was 82 officers and ratings.

The ships were powered by a single Brown-Curtis geared steam turbine that drove two propeller shafts using steam provided by three Yarrow boilers.

The Admiralty S-class ships were armed with three single QF  Mark IV guns. One gun was positioned on the forecastle, the second was on a platform between the funnels and the third at the stern. They were equipped with a single QF 2-pounder "pom-pom" anti-aircraft gun on a platform forward of the mainmast. They were also fitted with two rotating twin mounts for  torpedoes amidships and two 18-inch (450 mm) torpedo tubes, one on each broadside abaft the forecastle.

Construction and career
Seafire, the first ship of her name to serve in the Royal Navy, was ordered in June 1917 as part of the Twelfth War Programme from John Brown & Company. The ship was laid down at the company's Clydebank shipyard on 27 February 1918, launched on 10 August and commissioned in November.

After commissioning, Seafire joined the 14th Destroyer Flotilla of the Grand Fleet. She remained part of the 14th Flotilla in February 1919, but following a post-war reorganisation of the Royal Navy's destroyer forces, Seafire was listed as part of the 7th Destroyer Flotilla at the beginning of March 1919. Later that month, Seafire, commanded by Commander Andrew Browne Cunningham, later an Admiral of the Fleet, formed part of a force of two light cruisers and ten destroyers under the overall command of Admiral Walter Cowan, which was sent to the Baltic Sea as part of the British intervention in the Russian Civil War. Seafire sailed with only 60 percent of her normal crew, in a reflection of the Royal Navy's manning problems after the end of the First World War. On 3 April, Seafire arrived at Liepāja, Latvia, and was then sent to Ventspils, which was threatened by the advancing Bolshevik forces. Seafire set up soup kitchens to help feed the starving population of Ventspils, using up most of her rations, before returning to Liepāja after four days. On 16 April, Baltic Germans staged a Coup d'Etat in Latvia. Seafire, still at Liepāja, prevented the Baltic German forces from capturing the transport Saratov, carrying a load of arms and ammunition intended for the armies of the new Baltic states, and helped members of the provisional national government to escape to Saratov, which was protected by the Royal Navy. On 13 May, Cowan's flagship  was badly damaged when she struck a mine while on passage from Reval (now Tallinn) to Liepāja. Seafire escorted Curacoa back to Britain. In June, Seafire was still listed as part of the 7th Destroyer Flotilla at Rosyth, now part of the Reserve Fleet. Seafire transferred to the 5th Destroyer Flotilla in October 1919, but on 14 November, she was reduced to reserve at Devonport.

She was one of the obsolete destroyers handed over to the shipbreakers Thos.

Notes

Bibliography

 

S-class destroyers (1917) of the Royal Navy
Ships built on the River Clyde
1918 ships
World War I destroyers of the United Kingdom
Allied intervention in the Russian Civil War